

General Assembly

The General Assembly and Conventions of the Church of the Nazarene (General Assembly, or GA) is the premier convention of the Church of the Nazarene, as it is provided for the supreme legislative body of the Church of the Nazarene. Since 1985, the General Assembly has been held in the year following the United States presidential election. General Assemblies offer workshops, networking, seminars, and praise and worship services for all delegates and guests.

The Manual of the Church of the Nazarene dictates: "The General Assembly shall meet in the month of June, every fourth year, at such time and place as shall be determined by a General Assembly Commission composed of the general superintendents and an equal number of persons chosen by the Board of General Superintendents. The general superintendents and said commission shall also have power, in case of an emergency, to change the time and place of the meeting of the General Assembly." The General Assembly comprises elected and ex officio delegates from around the world. The General Assembly elects six general superintendents and a General Board, in whom authority is vested between General Assemblies. The general superintendents are assigned jurisdictional authority over the districts, regions and other institutions of the Church of the Nazarene, and are given authority to ordain qualified women and men into the ministry. (Article 304.5)"

The Church of the Nazarene announced in February 2007 that instead of a global convention to celebrate the centennial, each local church will participate in a global telecast on Sunday October 5, 2008.

Missions Conference

In the mid-quadrennial year, the USA/Canada region of the Church of the Nazarene hosts a conference which focuses on missions and evangelism for the United States and Canada Region. Commonly referred to as M and the numeral of the year it takes place in. (i.e. 2011 was called M11).  The most recent Missions Conference held was in Kansas City, Missouri.

Nazarene Youth International
The first NYI was known as the Nazarene Young Peoples Society. It was instituted in 1923. And is represented by those members of the Church of the Nazarene who are 13–25. In 2006, Nazarene Youth International (NYI) had 381,343 members. 181 Youth In Mission participates from 5 regional areas, and 2,320 Youthserve NYI Youthserve students served around the world for the Church of the Nazarene. 
The 22nd Convention of NYI held in Orlando, Florida was first truly global convention, featuring delegates in 7 other cities. These cities were Quito, Ecuador, Johannesburg, South Africa,  Büsingen am Hochrhein, Germany, Santo Domingo, Dominican Republic, Manila, Philippines, Santa Cruz, Trinidad and Tobago, and Mumbai, India.

Nazarene Youth Conference
In 1958 the first Nazarene Youth Conference or NYC was held in Estes Park, Colorado. Originally called the "International Institute," it was the brain child of the Nazarene Young Peoples Society (now Nazarene Youth International or NYI). NYC is an event that has focused on bringing together the Nazarene youths of the world for a time of praise and worship, Bible Quizzing, seminars, workshops, inspiring messages, and challenges to change their communities and the world through the power of the Gospel. Held in the off non-Olympiad to the General Assembly, NYC is the highlight for high-school aged teens every four years. Selection of the NYC Host City is done by the NYI Council. NYC has been hosted in four different countries (Germany, Mexico, Canada and the United States), making it the first Nazarene convention to be held outside the United States. Starting in 2003, Houston, NYC was designated “NYC USA/Canada” as other NYCs were being held in each of the seven world regions of the Nazarene Church. NYI USA/CANADA is also creating "mini-NYCs", similar to a spiritual retreat in nature, for the USA/Canada Region called FUEL. These events take place at various locations across the region. In 2008, FUEL was held in Los Angeles, CA; Orlando, FL, Nampa, ID, and Toronto, Ontario, Canada.

Previous names (first used):
NYPS: International Institute (1958)
World Youth Congress (1983)
Nazarene Youth Convention (1989) 
Nazarene Youth Congress (1987, 1991)
Nazarene Youth Conference (2003)

Third Wave
In addition to NYC, the Global NYI hosts an emerging leadership conference known as the Third Wave Conference.

References

External links
 27th General Assembly and Conventions
 M7 Conference
 NYC 2015
 NYC 2019

Church of the Nazarene